The Sands Point Stakes is a Grade II American Thoroughbred horse race for three-year-old fillies over a distance of  miles on the turf track scheduled annually in October at Belmont Park in Elmont, New York. The event currently offers a purse of $200,000.

History
The event is named after Sands Point, New York, a village located at the northernmost tip of the Cow Neck Peninsula on the North Shore of Long Island. 

The event was inaugurated on 23 June 1995 as the Sands Point Handicap and was run over the  mile distance with Perfect Arc ridden by US Hall of Fame jockey John R. Velazquez winning the event by five lengths over the odds-on favorite Miss Union Avenue in a time of 1:43.14. Perfect Arc in 1995 was crowned New York State Horse of the Year. 

In 1997 the distance of the event was increased to  mile.

In 1998 the conditions of the event were changed from a handicap to stakes allowance race. That same year the event was classified as Grade III.

In 2001 and 2003 the event was downgraded to a Listed event when it was raced on the main track due to inclement weather.

In 2008 the event was upgraded to Grade II. 

In 2020 the distance of the event was decreased to one mile and the following year the distance was reverted to  miles.

Records

Speed  record:
 miles:  1:46.65 – Auntie Mame (1997)
 miles:  1:42.50 – Discreet Marq (2013)

Margins:
 6 lengths – Tweedside   (2001)

Most wins by an owner:
 2 – Darley Stable (2008, 2012)
 2 – Head Of Plains Partners (2017, 2021)

Most wins by a trainer:
 5 – Chad C. Brown (2014, 2017, 2019, 2020, 2021)

Most wins by a jockey:
 3 – Joel Rosario (2015, 2019, 2021)
 3 – John R. Velazquez (1995, 2005, 2022)

Winners

Legend:

See also
List of American and Canadian Graded races

References

1995 establishments in New York (state)
Horse races in New York (state)
Belmont Park
Flat horse races for three-year-old fillies
Turf races in the United States
Graded stakes races in the United States
Grade 2 stakes races in the United States
Recurring sporting events established in 1995